Predrag "Gaga" Antonijević (born 7 February 1959) is a Serbian film director and screenwriter. In 2021, he was awarded the Order of Karađorđe's Star.

Filmography 

TV works

References

External links 

1959 births
Living people
People from Niš
Serbian film directors